Pierre Citron (19 April 1919 – 10 November 2010) was a French musicologist and university professor, a specialist of novelist Jean Giono. He was the husband of historian Suzanne Citron.

Biography 
Pierre Citron held the degrees of agrégé ès lettres (1946) and docteur ès lettres (1960); his main thesis was entitled La poésie de Paris dans la littérature française de Rousseau à Baudelaire. Attaché de recherche at the Centre national de la recherche scientifique from 1957 to 1960, he later was study director at the Institut français de Londres (1960–1963), then professor of French literature at the Faculté des lettres at the University of Clermont-Ferrand (1963–1969). From 1970 to 1983, he held the same position at the New Sorbonne University. He was responsible for the editions of works by Balzac, Villiers de l'Isle-Adam, Mallarmé and Giono. As a musicologist, he wrote popular books on Couperin and Bartók and, above all, was the prime architect for the publication of the general correspondence of Berlioz (8 volumes, 1972–2002), a composer whose memoirs he also edited twice (1969 and 1991).

His biography of Jean Giono earned him the prix Goncourt de la biographie in 1990. He also received the prix Henri Mondor awarded by the Académie française in 1987 for his Édition critique des poésies de Mallarmé.

Bibliography 
1956: Couperin, Paris, Seuil, Collection Microcosme. Solfèges
1961: La poésie de Paris dans la littérature française de Rousseau à Baudelaire, Paris, Éditions de Minuit
1963: Bartok, Paris, Seuil, Collection Microcosme. Solfèges
1986: Dans Balzac, Paris, Seuil
1990: Giono : 1895-1970, Paris, Seuil
1995: Giono, Paris, Seuil, Collection Microcosme. Écrivains de toujours
2010: Renaissance du village de Montjustin, Paris, Edition Petite Capitale

External links 
 Obituary on the site of the Sorbonne
  Pierre Citron, Dans Balzac (compte rendu) on Persée
 Pierre Citron on the site of the Académie française

Writers from Paris
1919 births
2010 deaths
20th-century French musicologists
Prix Goncourt de la Biographie winners
Bartók scholars